John Henry Kirby (November 16, 1860 – November 9, 1940) was a businessman whose ventures made him the largest lumber manufacturer in Texas and the Southern United States. In addition to serving two terms in the Texas Legislature, he also established the Kirby Petroleum Company. With his successful reputation, he was known by his business peers as "The Prince of the Pines" and "The Father of Industrial Texas".
Kirbyville, Texas in Jasper County is named after him, as is Kirby Drive and Upper Kirby in Houston.

Early life and political ties
He was born to John Thomas and Sarah (Payne) Kirby on November 16, 1860 in Tyler County, and brought up on the family's homestead which is now Camp Ta-Ku-La. First taught to read and write by his mother, his formal education later on was limited to rural schools and one semester at Southwestern University, Georgetown, where he studied law. With the influence of state senator Samuel Bronson Cooper, he served as a clerk in the Texas Senate from 1882 to 1884. During his clerkship he married Lelia Stewart of Woodville. He practiced law for four years before moving to Houston to join the law firm of Hobby and Lanier.

In 1887, with Cooper's influence, Kirby provided legal services to a group of investors from Boston, Massachusetts. With their financial backing, the east Texas timberland was harvested for lumber under the name Texas Pine Land Association. This business alone provided Kirby with a small fortune. In 1893 he partnered with a lawyer named Nathaniel D. Silsbee, an investor from Boston. These two, along with an investor named Ellington Pratt, established the Gulf, Beaumont and Kansas City Railroad from Beaumont to San Augustine. Upon the railroad's completion, Kirby sold it to the Atchison, Topeka and Santa Fe Railway which extended its line to the new lumber processing site at Silsbee, the town named after the investor. The sale of the railroad yielded a high profit for Kirby. It was at this location in 1900 that the Kirby Lumber Company was established. This business became the largest lumber producer in the south, with Kirby controlling 300,000 acres (1200 km²) of timberland. At its peak between 1910 and 1920, it had some 16,500 employees and included twelve operating mills and five logging camps.

Business venture in oil
The following year, and after the discovery of oil at Spindletop, Kirby partnered with Patrick Calhoun of the Houston Oil Company of Texas. Kirby created an unusual business relationship between his lumber company and the oil entity: the Kirby Lumber Company gained timber rights onto extensive east Texas land, where as the Houston Oil Company gained land and maintained mineral rights. Several years later, legal problems arose because Kirby overestimated the value of the lumber, and the partners failed to clearly define ownership of certain land areas. The Kirby Lumber Company still continued to prosper despite court ordered receivership status for both companies. In 1902, Kirby took over the Higgins Oil and Fuel Company owned by Pattillo Higgins for 3 million dollars. In 1921, Kirby established the Kirby Petroleum Company, a Houston-based oil and gas exploration company.

In 1923, Kirby received an honorary law degree from Lincoln Memorial University. Due to the Great Depression, his lumber company suffered financial strain and fell into the hands of the Atchison, Topeka and Santa Fe Railway in 1933 due to bankruptcy. He remained president of the enterprise until his death on November 9, 1940.

Personal beliefs on labor movements
John Henry Kirby was considered a generous employer, but was also well known for his opposition to labor unions. He also saw Franklin D. Roosevelt's plan for the working class a threat to American tradition. He even went as far as help co-found the Southern Committee to Uphold the Constitution in direct opposition to FDR’s New Deal and contributed his money and energies to other anti-New Deal and pro-segregation organizations.

John H. Kirby State Forest
In 1929, Kirby donated part of what is today the 626-acre (2.5 km²) John Henry Kirby State Forest, which is located in Tyler County in southeastern Texas.

Biographies
John Henry Kirby: Prince of the Pines, by Mary Lasswell Smith (1967)

References

External links
 
 Kirby Corporation website with historical information
 

1860 births
1940 deaths
Businesspeople in timber
American businesspeople in the oil industry
American people in rail transportation
19th-century American railroad executives
Businesspeople from Texas
People from Tyler County, Texas
Old Right (United States)